Basket Master is the European version name of the computer basketball game Fernando Martín Basket Master developed by Dinamic during 1987. Some versions, like C64 one, were developed by Imagine

It features Fernando Martín, a popular Spanish basketballer in the eighties. He was the first Spaniard who played in the NBA.

References

External links
Basket Master screenshots at mobygames.com
Basket Master at computeremuzone.com

1987 video games
Amstrad CPC games
Commodore 64 games
Dinamic Software games
Europe-exclusive video games
Video games developed in Spain
Video games developed in the United Kingdom
ZX Spectrum games
Basketball video games